John E. Turnbull was a Canadian inventor who lived in Saint John, New Brunswick in the 19th century. He is notable for inventing the first rolling wringer clothes washer in 1843.

References

Canadian inventors
People from Saint John, New Brunswick
Year of death missing
Year of birth missing